Bradford High School is located in Starke, Florida, United States. It serves grades 9–12 students in the Bradford County School District. There are approximately 813 students currently enrolled in Bradford High School as of school year 2017–2019.

Notable alumni
Larry Brown Played college football at the University of Kansas. Played Tight End and Tackle for the Pittsburgh Steelers from 1971 to 1984.

Athletics
Bradford High School students participate actively in the following sports:

 Baseball 
 Boys' Basketball 
 Boys' Golf 
 Boys' Tennis 
 Cheerleading 
 Football 
 Girls' Basketball 
 Girls' Golf
 Girls' Soccer 
 Girls' Tennis
 Girls' Weightlifting
 Softball 
 Track & Field 
 Volleyball 
 Wrestling

References

Public high schools in Florida
Education in Bradford County, Florida